Læstadiuspörtet is a rectory in the form of a cottage built of red timber located in Pajala Municipality, Sweden. Læstadiuspörtet was the home of the Swedish Lutheran pastor of Sámi descent and founder of Laestadianism, Lars Levi Laestadius, from 1851 until his death here in 1861, and now serves as the Laestadius Museum.

References

Further reading
Koistinen, L (2007): Lars Levi Laestadius prästgårdar 1826–1861
Ylitalo, K m.fl. (2000): Lars Levi Laestadius Årtusendets Norrbottning, Laestadiusprojektet, sid. 9.

External links
Laestadius Friends
Pajala Kommun/Kultur och Fritid - museum
Kringla Riksantikvarieämbetet

Clergy houses in Sweden
Museums in Sweden
Laestadianism